The knockout stage of the 1994–95 UEFA Champions League began on 1 March 1995 and ended with the final at the Ernst-Happel-Stadion in Vienna on 24 May 1995. The top two teams from each of the four groups in the group stage competed in the knockout stage. For the quarter-finals, each group winner was randomly drawn against the runner-up from another group. The four quarter-final winners were then drawn together for the semi-finals, the winners of which contested the final.

Each quarter-final and semi-final was played over two legs, with each team playing one leg at home; the team that scored the most goals over the two legs qualified for the following round. In the event that the two teams scored the same number of goals over the two legs, the team that scored more goals away from home qualified for the next round; if both teams scored the same number of away goals, matches would go to extra time and then penalties if the teams could not be separated after extra time.

Bracket

Quarter-finals

|}

First leg

Second leg

2–2 on aggregate; Bayern Munich won on away goals.

Ajax won 3–0 on aggregate.

Paris Saint-Germain won 3–2 on aggregate.

Milan won 2–0 on aggregate.

Semi-finals

 
|}

First leg

Second leg

Ajax won 5–2 on aggregate.

Milan won 3–0 on aggregate.

Final

Knockout Stage
1994-95